Crystal Creek Reservoir is a reservoir on Crystal Creek on the northwest side of Pikes Peak in Teller County, Colorado. The reservoir is impounded by Crystal Creek Dam, which is on the border of Teller and El Paso counties. The reservoir and surrounding Pike National Forest land offers opportunities for boating, fishing, camping, and hunting, among other activities and can be accessed from the Pikes Peak Highway.  It is one of three reservoirs that are part of the North Slope Recreation Area located northeast of Colorado Springs.

References

Reservoirs in Colorado
Bodies of water of Teller County, Colorado